West Dulwich ward, formerly known as Thurlow Park is an administrative division of the London Borough of Lambeth, England. It is located in the constituency of Dulwich and West Norwood.

It is located towards the South of the borough containing parts of Herne Hill, Tulse Hill (including the Tulse Hill railway station), West Dulwich and West Norwood. It is bordered in the north by Brockwell Park. The population of the ward at the 2011 Census was 13,641.

Ward demographics
Below are the demographics for Thurlow Park

Nearby attractions
The historic River Effra
South London Botanical Institute

Gallery

Lambeth Council elections

References

External links
Lambeth Borough Council profile for the ward
Thurlow Park ward results on Lambeth website

Wards of the London Borough of Lambeth